Benjamin Bachler (born 22 April 1994) is an Austrian footballer who currently plays for SC Bad Sauerbrunn.

He has previously played for LASK Linz, SPG FC Pasching/LASK Linz Juniors and SC Wiener Neustadt.

Career
In July 2018, Bachler joined SC Bad Sauerbrunn. Currently (summer 2022) in Finnish Vitonen for FC Germania Helsinki.

Honours

Club
LASK Linz
 Austrian Regional League Central (2): 2012–13, 2013–14

References

External links
 
 

1994 births
Living people
Austrian footballers
SC Wiener Neustadt players
LASK players
FC Juniors OÖ players
2. Liga (Austria) players
Austrian Regionalliga players
Footballers from Linz
Association football midfielders